Grant Parish is a parish located in the North Central portion of the U.S. state of Louisiana. As of the 2020 census, the population was 22,169. The parish seat is Colfax. The parish was founded in 1869 during the Reconstruction era.

Grant Parish is part of the Alexandria, LA Metropolitan Statistical Area and Red River Valley. From 1940 to 1960, the parish had a dramatic population loss, as many African Americans from the plantation areas left in the Great Migration to seek better opportunities in the North and West. Such migration continued until about 1970. One of the eleven parishes organized during Reconstruction, Grant was created from parts of Winn and Rapides parishes.

Grant Parish is the site of United States Penitentiary, Pollock.

History
Grant Parish was originally a part of the more populous Rapides Parish to the south. Prior to the American Civil War, the center of activity focused upon "Calhoun's Landing," named for the cotton and sugar planter Meredith Calhoun, a native of South Carolina. Calhoun also published the former National Democrat newspaper in what became Colfax, designated as the seat of government of the new parish.

Grant was one of several new parishes created by the Reconstruction legislature in an attempt to build the Republican Party in the state.  Founded in 1869, it had a slight majority of freedmen, many of whom had worked on cotton plantations in the area. It was named for U.S. President Ulysses S. Grant. The parish seat of Colfax was named for Grant's first vice president, Schuyler M. Colfax (whose name is pronounced COAL-facks) of Indiana. However, the town of Colfax is pronounced CAHL-facks. The parish came into existence on March 4, 1869, which also was the day of President Grant's first inauguration. The parish encompassed both cotton plantations and pinewoods. It was one of several areas along the Red River that had considerable violence during Reconstruction, as whites tried to maintain social control.

The gubernatorial election of 1872 was disputed in the state, and both the Democrats and Republicans certified their slates of local officers. Two inaugurations were held. The election was finally settled in favor of the Republican candidates, but the decision was disputed in certain areas. As social tensions rose, Republican officials took their places at the courthouse in Colfax. They were defended by freedmen and state militia (mostly made up of freedmen), who feared a Democratic Party takeover of the parish. Amid widespread rumors, whites organized a militia and advanced on the courthouse on Easter Sunday, 1873. In the ensuing violence, three whites and 120-150 blacks were killed, including 50 that night who were held as prisoners. Leading late 20th-century historians renamed the Colfax Riot, the original state designation, as the Colfax Massacre.  The total number of freedmen deaths were never established because some of the bodies were thrown into the river and woods.

The white militia was led by Christopher Columbus Nash, a Confederate officer who had been a prisoner of war at Johnson's Island in Ohio. It consisted of veterans from Grant and neighboring parishes. The following year, Nash gathered many of the white militia members as the basis of the first chapter of the White League.  Other chapters quickly grew up across the state. The White League's organized violence in support of the Democratic Party included widespread intimidation of black voters. The League was integral to white Democrats' regaining power in the state by 1876. Soon after, they effectively disfranchised most blacks, a situation that persisted until after federal enforcement of Civil Rights-era legislation of the mid-1960s.

Politics
Today Grant Parish is majority white and votes strongly Republican.  Mitt Romney polled 7,082 votes (81.7 percent) in his 2012 race against the Democrat U.S. President Barack H. Obama, who trailed with 1,422 votes (16.4 percent). In 2008, U.S. Senator John McCain of Arizona swept the parish, with 6,907 votes (80.7 percent) to Obama's 1,474 (17.2 percent).

In 1992, George Herbert Walker Bush carried Grant Parish but was unsuccessful in his bid for reelection. He polled 3,214 votes (40.8 percent) to Democratic Governor Bill Clinton of Arkansas's 3,122 (39.6 percent). This son of the South carried numerous other Republican-leaning jurisdictions. Ross Perot, who later founded the Reform Party, polled 1,174 (14.9 percent). In 1996, Republican Robert J. Dole narrowly won in Grant Parish over U.S. President Bill Clinton, a son of the South, with 3,117 votes (42.8 percent) to 2,980 (40.9 percent). Ross Perot polled another 1,055 (14.5 percent).  

The last Democrat to win in Grant Parish at the presidential level was former Governor Jimmy Carter of Georgia in his 1976 defeat of U.S. President Gerald R. Ford, Jr., who had Bob Dole as his vice-presidential partner.

Republican nominee Donald Trump was a runaway winner in Grant Parish in 2016 over Democrat Hillary Rodham Clinton: 7,408 (84 percent) to 1,181 (13 percent).

Nativity scene
In December 2016, a courthouse nativity scene in Colfax drew a complaint from the New Orleans chapter of the American Civil Liberties Union. In a letter to the Grant Parish Police Jury, the ACLU said that officials must include secular symbols of the Christmas holiday if a nativity scene is placed alone on public property. District Attorney Jay Lemoine objected to the ACLU challenge in a statement to Alexandria Town Talk: "There have been various holiday displays presented both inside and outside the courthouse over many years. This year, as in years past, they include both secular and non-secular symbols. It is unfortunate that some are offended by these displays during this holiday season, as that was not the intent."

Geography

Major highways

  U.S. Highway 71
  U.S. Highway 165
  U.S. Highway 167
  Louisiana Highway 8
  Louisiana Highway 34
  Louisiana Highway 122
  Louisiana Highway 123
  Louisiana Highway 471
  Louisiana Highway 500

Adjacent parishes
 Winn Parish  (north)
 La Salle Parish  (east)
 Rapides Parish  (south)
 Natchitoches Parish  (west)

National protected area
 Kisatchie National Forest (part)

Demographics

2020 census

As of the 2020 United States census, there were 22,169 people, 6,989 households, and 4,651 families residing in the parish.

2000 census
As of the census of 2000, there were 18,698 people, 7,073 households, and 5,276 families residing in the parish. There were 8,531 housing units at an average density of 13 per square mile (5/km2). The racial makeup of the parish was 85.43% White, 11.88% Black or African American, 0.89% Native American, 0.14% Asian, 0.03% Pacific Islander, 0.36% from other races, and 1.28% from two or more races. 1.14% of the population were Hispanic or Latino of any race.

The decreases in population from 1910 to 1920, and from 1940 to 1960, were chiefly caused by different phases of the Great Migration, as African Americans left segregation and oppression of the South to seek better opportunities in the North, during the first phase, and in the West, especially California's defense industry, in the second phase. Tens of thousands of migrants left Louisiana during times of agricultural difficulties and the collapse of agricultural labor after mechanization.

In 2000, there were 7,073 households, out of which 36.50% had children under the age of 18 living with them, 57.20% were married couples living together, 12.90% had a female householder with no husband present, and 25.40% were non-families. 22.60% of all households were made up of individuals, and 10.10% had someone living alone who was 65 years of age or older. The average household size was 2.61 and the average family size was 3.06.

In the parish the population was spread out, with 28.30% under the age of 18, 7.90% from 18 to 24, 28.10% from 25 to 44, 23.00% from 45 to 64, and 12.70% who were 65 years of age or older. The median age was 36 years. For every 100 females there were 96.10 males. For every 100 females age 18 and over, there were 93.00 males.

The median income for a household in the parish was $29,622, and the median income for a family was $34,878. Males had a median income of $31,235 versus $20,470 for females. The per capita income for the parish was $14,410. About 16.90% of families and 21.50% of the population were below the poverty line, including 27.30% of those under age 18 and 16.20% of those age 65 or over.

Government and infrastructure 
The Federal Bureau of Prisons U.S. Penitentiary, Pollock is located in an unincorporated area in the parish, near Pollock.

Education
Public schools in Grant Parish are operated by the Grant Parish School Board.

National Guard
A Company 199TH FSB (Forward Support Battalion) resides in Colfax, Louisiana.  This unit deployed twice to Iraq as part of the 256TH IBCT in 2004-5 and 2010.

Communities

Towns 
 Colfax (parish seat and largest municipality)
 Montgomery
 Pollock

Villages
 Creola
 Dry Prong
 Georgetown

Unincorporated areas

Census-designated places 
 Prospect
 Rock Hill

Unincorporated communities 
 Aloha
 Bentley
 Fishville
 Hargis
 Oak Grove
 Selma
 Verda

Prison

Notable people
 W. K. Brown, state representative from Grant Parish from 1960 to 1972
 Joe T. Cawthorn (1911-1967), lawyer, businessman, and politician affiliated with the Long faction, born in Selma in Grant Parish, resided in Mansfield in DeSoto Parish
 Billy Ray Chandler, state representative from Grant Parish, 2006-2012
 Jesse C. Deen (1922-2015), state representative from primarily Bossier Parish, 1972–1988; reared in the Hargis Community near Montgomery
 Stephen Lee "Steve" Gunn, former mayor of Montgomery; represented Grant Parish in the legislature as an Independent from 1992 to 1996
 Leonard R. "Pop" Hataway, sheriff of Grant Parish, 1976 to 2008; member of the Louisiana Board of Pardons and Paroles; member of the Louisiana Political Museum and Hall of Fame
 Ed Head (1918–1980), Major League Baseball player who played for the Brooklyn Dodgers
 Swords Lee, timber owner from Pollock and Alexandria; former Grant Parish assessor and state representative
 W. T. McCain (1913-1993) - State representative for Grant Parish 1940 to 1948; first state court judge for only Grant Parish (1976), lawyer in Colfax
 W.L. Rambo, member of both houses of the Louisiana State Legislature from Georgetown.
 Ed Tarpley (born 1953), district attorney for Grant Parish from 1991 to 1997
 Richard S. Thompson (1916-1997), state representative from Grant Parish from 1972 to 1984
 Russ Springer, Major League baseball player

See also
 National Register of Historic Places listings in Grant Parish, Louisiana

References

 
Louisiana parishes
Parishes in Alexandria metropolitan area, Louisiana
1869 establishments in Louisiana
Populated places established in 1869